Hana Kvášová (born 28 September 1989) is a Czech handball player for Sambre Avesnois Handball and the Czech national team.

She represented the Czech Republic at the 2020 European Women's Handball Championship.

References

External links

1989 births
Living people
Czech female handball players
Expatriate handball players
Czech expatriate sportspeople in France
Sportspeople from Havlíčkův Brod
21st-century Czech women